Ngame is a town in Kyauktaw Township, Sittwe District, in the Rakhine State of western Myanmar (formerly known as Burma), located on the right bank of the Kaladan River, just south of the border with Chin State.

References

External links
"Ngame Map — Satellite Images of Ngame", Maplandia.com

Populated places in Rakhine State